All of them Witches (Sobrenatural) is a 1996 Mexican supernatural horror film by director Daniel Gruener. Based on a screenplay by Gabriel González Meléndez, it features Susana Zabaleta, Ricardo Blume, Alejandro Tommasi, and Delia Casanova. The name of this movie matches that of a book of witchcraft that appeared in the 1968 film Rosemary's Baby, based on the book by Ira Levin.

Plot 
After Dolores (Zabaleta) hears a neighbor being killed, her husband Andres (Tommasi) tries to dispel her fears about gang activity in their apartment building. After he falls asleep, however, she overhears her husband muttering the murdered neighbor's name. Another neighbor, the witch-like Madame Endor (Casanova) warns Dolores that she is in danger and her concerns are then confirmed by her psychiatrist. Dolores begins to believe that disturbing events happening around are the work of the devil.

Cast
 Susana Zabaleta  as Dolores Berthier
 Alejandro Tommasi  as Andrés Berthier
 Ricardo Blume as Dr. Riojas
 Delia Casanova as  Madame Endor
 Francis Laboriel as Zombie
 Roberto Cobo as Ferretero
 Zaide Silvia Gutiérrez as Eva María Herrera

Reception 

In 1996, the film, which is entirely in Spanish, was a winner of Prieto Mexico's Ariel and Diosa de Plata Awards. The following year, it won the Colombia Film Festival Award for best cinematography.

References

External links

 
 

1996 films
Folk horror films
1990s horror thriller films
Mexican supernatural horror films
1990s supernatural horror films
Supernatural thriller films
1990s Spanish-language films
Films about witchcraft
1990s Mexican films